Alex Frost is a British contemporary artist, exhibiting internationally.

Background 
Alex Frost currently lives and works in London.

Exhibitions 
Frost's often humorous work addresses the fluid boundaries between public and private space, the virtual and physical, the temporal and permanent. He is best known for his large mosaic sculptures that depict product packaging and branding. These have been included in exhibitions at Dundee Contemporary Arts, Venice Biennale, Milton Keynes Gallery, Studio Voltaire and Frieze Sculpture Park.

His recent exhibition ‘The New Work’ referenced the flexible workplace, a place where work and life have lost their distinctions. The exhibition ‘captured’ items that were emblematic of the fluidity of the contemporary workplace. It featured supermarket-bought sandwiches encased in resin, hanging from lanyards, propped on computer stands, and dangling from mobiles. The exhibition, held in a storage unit in London's Hackney Wick, was closed to the public and only viewable online.

In 2018, he devised ‘Wet Unboxing’, a series of videos he uploaded onto YouTube. In these videos he opened products underwater. The products were all symbolic of a super-mobile or ‘on the go’ lifestyle. Described on Vice Motherboard as ‘a proto-meme—a precious, terrifying embryo—of the next new trend’.

Residencies 
In 2015 he was Phynance Resident at Flat Time House, London. His other residencies include Cove Park, Scotland in 2014; The Walled Garden, Glasgow in 2013; AIR Antwerpen, Belgium in 2010; Glenfiddich Artist Residency, Dufftown, Scotland in 2009; Artsway, Hampshire in 2007; Spike Island, Bristol in 2002 and Grizedale Arts, Cumbria in 2000.

Collaborations 
In addition to his independent art practice he has been involved in a number of artistic collaborations. Notably, the devising and running of the artist-run radio station Radiotuesday (1998-2002) with Duncan Campbell (artist) and Mark Vernon; Wave Rhythm by Louis Braille (2012) with Stephen Livingstone from Errors (band), a limited edition flexi-disc single generated using a hybrid analogue/digital music and drawing machine and Flourish Nights (2001) a season of screenings and performances organised with the artists Lucy McKenzie, Sophie Macpherson and Julian Kildear.

Collections 
Frost's work is held in numerous private and public collections with his mosaic sculpture Adult (Ryvita/Crackerbread)(2007) in the collection of Glasgow Museums

Notes and references

Further reading 
Josephine Berry, Claire Louise Staunton, Property Guardian (Flat Time House, London), 2015.
Paul Becker, Future Spotters (Wewerka Pavilion, Muenster), 2013 	
Drawing Biennial 2013 (Drawing Room, London), 2013 	
AIR Traces, (AIR Antwerpen, Belgium), 2013 	
100 Years, 100 Artists, 100 Works of Art, (Art On The Underground, London), 2012.
Soul Seekers: Interpreting the Icon  (Trinity Museum, New York), 2012.
Industrial Aesthetics; Environmental Influences on Recent Art from Scotland (The Times Square Gallery, New York), 2011.
Drawn In (Travelling Gallery, Edinburgh), 2011.
Graham Domke, The Connoisseurs (Dundee Contemporary Arts, Dundee), 2010.
Artists at Glenfiddich 09, (The Glenfiddich Distillery, Dufftown, Scotland), 2010.
Finger Buffet (Travelling Gallery, Scotland), 2009.
Jerwood Sculpture Prize (Jerwood Visual Arts, London), 2009.
Artsway's New Forest Pavilion (Artsway, Sway), 2008.
Will Bradley, Supplements (Sorcha Dallas, Milton Keynes Gallery and Artsway), 2008.
Karla Black, 1973 (The Changing Room, Stirling), 2004.
Synth (Kunstraum B/2, Germany), 2004.
East International (Norwich Gallery, Norwich), 2003.
Karla Black, Alex Frost, An American Conversation (Cooper Gallery, DJCAD, Dundee), 2003.
Presence (The Fruitmarket gallery, Edinburgh).
Happy Outsiders from London and Scotland  (Zacheta Panstwowa Gallery, Warsaw), 2002.
Hero (St Mary's Cathedral, Glasgow), 2002.
Half the World Away (Hallwalls contemporary Arts Center), 2002.
Rob Tufnell, For Example (Spike Island, Bristol), 2002.
Transmission, (Transmission Gallery, Glasgow), 2002.

External links
Alex Frost's website
An essay by Josephine Berry to accompany Alex Frost's Property Guardian publication.
Alex Frost's profile page on the Artist Pension Trust
Alex Frost introduces his exhibition 'Reproduction'
Outset Scotland's page on The Patrons, an exhibition at Cove Park, Scotland.
Video documentation of The Connoisseurs at DCA, Scotland
Adult an exhibition at MK Gallery
review in Frieze magazine
Alex Frost In Dialogue with Steven Cox from Hunted Projects

British sculptors
British male sculptors
1973 births
Alumni of Staffordshire University
Living people
English contemporary artists
People from Tottenham
Alumni of the Glasgow School of Art